Drosophila dissimilis is a species of fly in the subgenus Dudaica.

References 

dissimilis
Insects described in 2018